Duck Pond is a 1980 fantasy role-playing game adventure published by Judges Guild.

Contents
Duck Pond is a dungeon adventure featuring one hundred rooms.

Reception
Forrest Johnson reviewed Duck Pond in The Space Gamer No. 36. Johnson commented that "A fine adventure, though not as polished as Duck Tower."

References

Judges Guild RuneQuest adventures
Role-playing game supplements introduced in 1980
RuneQuest 2nd edition supplements